The 1965 Northern Ireland general election was held on 25 November 1965. Like all previous elections to the Parliament of Northern Ireland, it produced a large majority for the Ulster Unionist Party. This was the last election in Northern Ireland in which one party won a majority of the vote. The Ulster Unionists increased their vote share largely due to a reduction in the number of uncontested seats, but also picked up two additional seats. Similarly, the Nationalist vote share decreased largely due to more of the seats in which they stood candidates being contested.

Results

|}
All parties shown. The only independent candidate was elected unopposed.
Electorate: 907,667 (563,252 in contested seats); Turnout: 57.6% (324,589).

Votes summary

Seats summary

See also
List of members of the 11th House of Commons of Northern Ireland

References
Northern Ireland Parliamentary Election Results 

1965
Northern Ireland general election
Northern Ireland general election
General election